Fuente de los Azulejos is an unusual rock formation on the island of Gran Canaria. The name literally means "fountain of tiles", because of the colour of the rocks resembling Portuguese tiles. These colours are caused by the process of hydrothermal alteration and oxidisation.

References

Landforms of Gran Canaria